Fajã de Baixo is a town in the northern part of the island of São Nicolau, Cape Verde. It is situated 2 km south of Estância de Brás and 5 km northwest of Ribeira Brava.

Notable person
João Lopes Filho, anthropologist and linguist

See also
List of cities and towns in Cape Verde

References

Geography of São Nicolau, Cape Verde
Ribeira Brava, Cape Verde
Towns in Cape Verde